Calpurnia may refer to:

Ancient Rome
 Calpurnia gens, an ancient Roman family
Calpurnia (wife of Caesar), last wife of Roman dictator Julius Caesar
Calpurnia (wife of Pliny), third and last wife of Pliny the Younger and granddaughter of Calpurnius Fabatus
Lex Acilia Calpurnia (67 BC), a severe law against political corruption
Lex Calpurnia (149 BC), a law that established a permanent extortion court

Science
Calpurnia (plant), a genus in the family Fabaceae
Calpurnia, the central crater in a series of "snowman craters" on the asteroid 4 Vesta
2542 Calpurnia, an asteroid

Arts, entertainment, and media
Calpurnia (band)
Calpurnia (play), a 2018 play by Audrey Dwyer
Calpurnia, African-American cook and maid for the Finch family in the novel To Kill a Mockingbird
Shira Calpurnia, protagonist of three Warhammer 40,000 novels, see List of Warhammer 40,000 novels#Enforcer: Shira Calpurnia
Calpurnia Virginia Tate, protagonist of the novel The Evolution of Calpurnia Tate

People with the given name
Calpernia Addams, American transgender author and activist